Leroy W. Svendsen Jr. was a retired major general in the United States Air Force.

Biography
Svendsen was born in Chicago, Illinois in 1928. He attended Florida State University. Svendsen died in February 2022, at the age of 93.

Career
Svendsen joined the Air Force in 1948. During the Korean War he was stationed at Johnson Air Base and Taegu Air Base. Following the war he was stationed at Truax Field. Later he served in the Vietnam War. In 1966 he was stationed at The Pentagon and later served in the Office of the United States Secretary of the Air Force as a liaison for the United States House of Representatives. From 1974 to 1975 he was in command of the 29th Flying Training Wing. Svendsen was appointed Defense Attaché to Egypt in 1975. In 1977 he was given command of the Air Force Manpower and Personnel Center and was stationed at Randolph Air Force Base. His retirement was effective as of June 1, 1980.

Awards he has received include the Air Force Distinguished Service Medal, the Legion of Merit, the Distinguished Flying Cross, the Bronze Star Medal, the Meritorious Service Medal, the Air Medal with silver oak leaf cluster and four bronze oak leaf clusters, the Air Force Commendation Medal with oak leaf cluster, and the Outstanding Unit Award. Svendsen is also a member of the Order of the Sword.

References

1928 births
Living people
United States Air Force personnel of the Korean War
United States Air Force personnel of the Vietnam War
Recipients of the Air Force Distinguished Service Medal
Recipients of the Legion of Merit
Recipients of the Distinguished Flying Cross (United States)
Recipients of the Air Medal
Recipients of the Order of the Sword (United States)
Florida State University alumni
United States Air Force generals
American expatriates in Egypt
Military personnel from Chicago